Jacques Rougeau Sr. (May 27, 1930 – July 1, 2019) was a Canadian professional wrestler. He was the father of wrestlers Jacques Rougeau, Armand Rougeau and Raymond Rougeau.

Career
Rougeau started wrestling in 1956 with his brother, Johnny Rougeau. He had feuds with Abdullah the Butcher, Alexis Smirnoff, Don Leo Jonathan and The Sheik.

In 1984, Rougeau came out of semi-retirement to fight a series of matches in Quebec. Teaming with his three sons, Jacques, Armand and Raymond, the Rougeaus fought against many heels in the area, such as Pierre 'Mad Dog' Lefebvre, Frenchy Martin, Sailor White and Tarzan Tyler.

Rougeau retired in 1986.

Championships and accomplishments
International Wrestling Association (Montreal)
IWA International Heavyweight Championship (5 times)
IWA International Tag Team Championship (1 time) – with Gino Brito
National Wrestling Federation
NWF Heavyweight Championship (1 time) 
NWF World Tag Team Championship (1 time) – with Johnny Powers

See also
 Rougeau wrestling family

References

1930 births
2019 deaths
Canadian male professional wrestlers
Professional wrestlers from Quebec
Professional wrestling executives
Sportspeople from Montreal
French Quebecers
20th-century professional wrestlers
NWF Heavyweight Champions
NWF World Tag Team Champions